Robert George Howes, known professionally as Overseer (or Rob Overseer) is an English electronic music producer and DJ, also working under the alias Fatlantic and part of Kanute with Rachael Mantle. His works have been included in soundtracks for Blade: Trinity,  The Animatrix, Snatch, Any Given Sunday and The Girl Next Door, as well as video games like  Gran Turismo 3, Edgar Torronteras` Extreme Biker,  Need for Speed: Underground, SSX 3, NFL Gameday 2004, several Matchstick Productions ski films, Stuntman, Twin Caliber (Rage Software, 2002) which was used to promote his then new EP "Force Multiply" in game's manual, and Ridge Racer Unbounded. His songs are also frequently used in TV commercials such as "Hairdo" for Vodafone which featured his song Velocity Shift or the Endeavor commercial for Mitsubishi, which featured "Horndog". Also, the MTV show Maui Fever features his single Horndog in the opening credits.

Overseer also records with singer/songwriter Rachael Gray. They first worked together on the track "Sparks" which appeared on the Overseer album "Wreckage" on the Columbia label. Following the success of "Sparks", work began on a full album project under the name Kanute. Also, former UFC fighter Ken Shamrock used Rob's "Slayed" as his entrance theme on his last two fights. In addition, Mauricio "Shogun" Rua used this song as his entrance song for UFC 76 as well as Keith Jardine for UFC 89.  On 27 September 2018, Howes announced a new album and change of name stating "Overseer is no more, I am now trading as FATLANTIC" on his personal Facebook page.

Overseer's style is most frequently described as big beat.

Wreckage
Wreckage was released in the US in 2003. The UK release of this album was plagued with many difficulties that led to a six-month delay in its release, prompting Rob to move to new management at the end of 2005.

2006 album
In 2006 Overseer was to make a second album. The album was expected to contain Skylight, a track that featured on the Blade: Trinity soundtrack. It was later announced that the album had been "held up for a little while".

In a reply on his official Twitter, Overseer posted, in regards to a second Kanute album, and the future of Overseer : "Sorry I'm taking my sweet f'ing time, concentrating on Kanute album for next few months, then back to Overseer cheers x"

This could maybe mean that the songs "Skylight", "Invincible Love" and "Hammerhead" may move to a newer album, much like Wreckage, which compiled Overseer tracks from the last 3–5 years they were created.

On 27 September 2018, Howes announced a new album and change of name stating "Overseer is no more, I am now trading as FATLANTIC" on his personal Facebook page

As Overseer

Albums
Wreckage (2003 - Columbia)

EPs
The Zeptastic (1995 - Soundclash)
Hit The Tarmac (1997 - Soundclash)
Everything Louder Than Everything Else (2001 - Columbia)
Superconductor (2019 - Warner Chapell)

Remixes
Adam F. feat. MOP - "Stand Clear" (Overseer Retake) - (2002)
Kaiser Chiefs - "I Predict a Riot" (Overseer Remix) - (2005)
Overseer - "Slayed" (Kostas Petropoulos Mix)  - (2005)

Compilation appearances
Mad Dash Racing (2001) - Stompbox, Insectocutor Dub
The Tuxedo (2002) - Screw Up
The Animatrix OST (2003) - Supermoves (Animatrix remix)
Blade: Trinity OST (2004) - Skylight
Need For Speed Underground - Supermoves, Doomsday
TOCA Touring Car series - Supermoves
SSX3 - Screw Up
Gran Turismo 3 - Stompbox, Supermoves, Screw Up
Shaun White Snowboarding - Stompbox
Edgar Torronteras Extreme Biker - Stompbox, Velocity Shift
Snatch (2000)  - Supermoves
Any Given Sunday OST  - Stompbox
MotorStorm: Arctic Edge  - Hammerhead
Stuntman - Basstrap, Velocity Shift
Driver: San Francisco - Pump Action
Twin Caliber (2002) - Supermoves (used as main menu theme).
Ridge Racer Unbounded (2012) - Crash & Burn

With Kanute
"Standing Room Only" (2010)
"Ursa Minor" (2014)
"Flotsam" (2018)

As Fatlantic 
 "Offshore Breaks" (2018)
 "Gettin Like That" (with Jordan Jane) (2019)

References

External links
Artist Webpage

English electronic musicians
English DJs
Breakbeat musicians
Living people
Big beat musicians
Electronic dance music DJs
Year of birth missing (living people)